Dowker Island is an uninhabited island in Lake Saint Louis, a widening of the Saint Lawrence River south of Montreal Island, Quebec. It is in the municipality of Notre-Dame-de-l'Île-Perrot which intends to preserve its natural state.

The island is about a kilometre in length and breadth. Its surface geology is undifferentiated till deposits. It is low-lying, mostly in a 100-year flood area, and contains a muskrat habitat.

History

Then known as one of the îles Sainte-Geneviève (now Dowker, Madore, and Daoust), the island was granted to governor of Montreal François-Marie Perrot by Jean Talon, in 1672, along with the île Perrot. It was acquired in 1897 by Leslie Rose Dowker (unknown-1945), who shortly afterward became Mayor of Sainte-Anne-du-Bout-de-l'Île, now known as Sainte-Anne-de-Bellevue.

It is the site of a ruined stone house as well as a former navigational aid light.

In older documents, as late as the 1966 topographic map of Sainte-Anne-de-Bellevue, it is named Lynch Island.

References

Hochelaga Archipelago
Landforms of Montreal
Uninhabited islands of Canada
Islands of the Saint Lawrence River